Penicillium giganteum is a species of the genus of Penicillium which was isolated from soil.

References

giganteum
Fungi described in 1968